Off Beat is a 1986 American comedy film about a young librarian who impersonates a police officer. The film was directed by Michael Dinner, and stars Judge Reinhold, Meg Tilly, Cleavant Derricks and Harvey Keitel.

Plot

Joe Gower is a likable librarian who glides around his job on roller skates. He has a strict boss, Mr. Pepper, and a good friend who's a cop, Abe Washington.

A mistake he makes inadvertently messes up Washington's undercover work. Joe now owes him a favor, but is unprepared for what Washington wants. A police charity event needs officers to dress in drag, but because Washington wants no part of that, he asks Joe to take his place.

A reluctant Joe decides to go through with the audition, expecting to be so bad that he won't be cast in the show. When he goes there and meets an attractive policewoman, Rachel Wareham, it changes everything. Joe not only does the show, he continues to keep from Rachel the fact that he's not a real cop.

As luck would have it, Joe finds himself in the midst of actual crimes. He encounters criminals, like bank robber Mickey, and is caught in a crossfire as to which would be worse, being exposed as someone impersonating a police officer or being shot by a crook.

Cast
 Judge Reinhold as Joe Gower
 Meg Tilly as Rachel Wareham
 John Turturro as Pepper
 Cleavant Derricks as Abe Washington
 Jacques d'Amboise as August
 Harvey Keitel as Mickey
 Joe Mantegna as Pete Peterson
 Amy Wright as Mary Ellen
 Anthony Zerbe as Mr. Wareham
 Julie Bovasso as Mrs. Wareham
 Victor Argo as Leon
 Penn Jillette as Norman
 Mel Winkler as Earl
 Irving Metzman as Deluca
 Mike Starr as James Bonnell
 Shawn Elliott as Hector
 Stanley Simmonds as Pud
 Nancy Giles as Celestine
 Paul Butler as Jordan
 John Kapelos as Lou Wareham
 William Sadler as Dickson (as Bill Sadler)
 Chris Noth as Ely Wareham Jr. (as Christopher Noth)
 Austin Pendleton as Gun Shop Salesman

Critical response
In his review of April 11, 1986, Roger Ebert of the Chicago Sun-Times gave Off Beat three-and-a-half stars out of a possible four, describing it as one of the year's best comedies.

Reinhold later said the film was "a little love story they tried to sell as a ... comedy. It wasn't marketed right. It wasn't a Police Academy clone movie, (but) people got the impression that it was. It was a pretty tame movie, by those standards, but I was proud of it."

References

External links
 
 
 

1986 films
1986 romantic comedy films
Films shot in New York City
Touchstone Pictures films
Films scored by James Horner
Films produced by Joe Roth
1980s English-language films
American romantic comedy films
1980s American films
Films directed by Michael Dinner